The Alternative (Albanian: Alternativa) is a liberal political party in Kosovo.

History
Ilir Deda was elected MP for Vetëvendosje in the parliamentary election of 2014. However, during the anti-governmental protests in Kosovo in 2015–16, Deda became a loud critic of his party's support for the acts of violence towards government officials and therefore left the party on 2 April 2016. Similarly, Mimoza Kusari-Lila, former Minister of Trade and Industry and Deputy Prime Minister for the New Kosovo Alliance and current Mayor of Gjakova left her party in May 2016 due to the conflicts within the party and ideological differences and decided to join Deda's "new initiative".

Officially launched on 8 February 2017 by MP Ilir Deda and Mayor of Gjakova Mimoza Kusari-Lila in Mitrovica, and on 13 May 2017, General Council of Alternativa decided that Mimoza Kusari-Lila would be president of the party and Ilir Deda would be deputy president of the party.

Presidents (2017–present)

Ideology
In an interview, Kusari-Lila mentioned that human rights are the main importance and priority of the party, thus individual rights.

Election results

References

External links
The Alternative (Kosovo) at Facebook
The Alternative (Kosovo) at Instagram

2017 establishments in Kosovo
Centrist parties in Kosovo
Liberal parties in Kosovo
Political parties established in 2017
Political parties in Kosovo